Stephanoberyx monae is a species of pricklefish found in the western Atlantic Ocean at depths of from . This species is the only known member of its genus.

References
 

Stephanoberycidae
Fish described in 1883